Ole Breistøl (born 11 July 1998) is a Norwegian footballer who plays for Ullensaker/Kisa IL.

Career

Ull/Kisa
On 13 January 2020 Ullensaker/Kisa IL confirmed, that Breistøl had joined the club on a deal until the end of 2021.

References

External links
Ole Breistøl at NFF

1998 births
Living people
Norwegian footballers
Eliteserien players
Norwegian Second Division players
Sandefjord Fotball players
IF Fram Larvik players
Ullensaker/Kisa IL players
Association football wingers
People from Sandefjord
Sportspeople from Vestfold og Telemark